Calliostoma veleroae is a species of sea snail, a marine gastropod mollusk in the family Calliostomatidae.

Description
The height of the shell attains 20 mm.

Distribution
This species occurs in the Pacific Ocean off Panama.

References

External links
 To World Register of Marine Species
 

veleroae
Gastropods described in 1970